Walter Lemon Jr. (born July 26, 1992) is an American professional basketball player for Club Africain. He played college basketball for four years with the Bradley Braves.

High school career
Lemon attended Julian High School where he averaged 19 points, six assists, five rebounds and three steals per game as a senior, earning him a third-team 3A all-state pick by the Illinois Basketball Coaches Association and a second-team All-Chicago Public League.

College career
After graduating, Lemon went to Bradley where he averaged 18 points and 3 rebounds as a senior. When he graduated he ranked among Bradley's all-time top 10 in career points (1721, 7th), assists (367, 10th) and steals (222, 3rd) and had several awards, including the MVC Men's Basketball Scholar-Athlete of the Year in 2014, Bradley's first player ever to win the award.

Professional career

Körmend (2014)
After going undrafted in the 2014 NBA draft, Lemon joined the Golden State Warriors for the 2015 NBA Summer League. On September 10, 2014, he signed with Hungarian team EGIS Körmend for the 2014–15 season. On December 23, 2014, he parted ways with the club after appearing in 12 league games.

Crailsheim Merlins (2015)
On February 6, 2015, he signed with the Crailsheim Merlins of Germany for the rest of the season. In eight games for the Merlins, he averaged 6.4 points, 1.0 rebounds and 1.1 assists per game.

Fort Wayne Mad Ants (2015–2016)
On October 31, 2015, Lemon was selected by the Fort Wayne Mad Ants in the second round of the 2015 NBA Development League Draft.

İstanbulspor Beylikdüzü (2016)
On July 15, 2016, Lemon signed with İstanbulspor Beylikdüzü of the TBL.

Rethymno Cretan Kings (2017)
On February 20, 2017, Lemon Jr. signed with the Greek team Rethymno Cretan Kings.

Fort Wayne Mad Ants (2017–2018)
On November 2, 2017, Lemon was included in the opening night roster for Fort Wayne Mad Ants. Lemon was later named G League Player of the Month for November.

New Orleans Pelicans (2018)
On February 21, 2018, the New Orleans Pelicans signed Lemon to a 10-day contract. He made his NBA debut two days later in a 124–123 overtime win over the Miami Heat, playing in four minutes that night. Lemon signed his second 10-day contract on March 4. After the expiration of his second 10-day contract, Lemon returned to Fort Wayne.

Maine Red Claws (2018)
On July 25, Lemon signed a two-way contract with the Boston Celtics. During this time, he was expected to split his playing time between the Celtics and their NBA G League affiliate, the Maine Red Claws. On November 29, 2018, Lemon was waived by the Celtics without appearing in a game for the parent club.

Windy City Bulls (2018–2019)
On December 8, 2018, the Fort Wayne Mad Ants announced that they had acquired the right of Alex Hamilton and a first round pick in the 2019 NBA G League draft from the Windy City Bulls in exchange for the right to Lemon.

On January 16, 2019, Lemon was suspended for one game without pay and fined for directing inappropriate language towards a game official.

Chicago Bulls (2019)
On March 29, 2019, the Chicago Bulls announced that they had signed Lemon. On March 30th, 2019, Lemon made his debut with the Bulls, scoring 19 points with 6 assists and four steals. In his third game in a Chicago Bulls uniform, in a game against the Wizards in Washington D.C. on April 3, 2019, Lemon led all players with 24 points in a very efficient 11 of 16 from the floor while leading all players with eight assists. In the final minute of the game, Lemon hit one go ahead basket and afterwards a go-ahead free throw. On the other end of the floor Lemon played hard, tenacious defense to secure the victory for the Bulls, 115–114.

Fort Wayne Mad Ants (2019–2020)
On October 10, 2019, the Indiana Pacers announced that they had signed Lemon. This comes after the release of 2x Sun Belt Defensive Player of the Year JaKeenan Gant. Terms of the contract weren't released. On October 16, 2019, Lemon was waived by the Indiana Pacers. On October 26, 2019, Lemon was included in the training camp roster for the Fort Wayne Mad Ants. On November 6, 2019, Lemon was included in the opening night roster of the Fort Wayne Mad Ants. He averaged 20.3 points, 6.8 assists and 4.4 rebounds per game.

Hapoel Tel Aviv (2020–2021)
On August 15, 2020, Lemon signed with Hapoel Tel Aviv of the Israeli Premier League. He averaged 10.6 points, 4.2 assists and 1.4 steals per game.

Ezzahra Sports (2021)
On September 11, 2021, Lemon signed with Ezzahra Sports of the Championnat National A.

Return to the Fort Wayne Mad Ants (2021–2022)
On December 30, 2021, Lemon signed with the Fort Wayne Mad Ants of the NBA G League, averaging 12.3 points and 6.2 assists in 32 games.

Ottawa BlackJacks (2022)
On May 2, 2022, Lemon signed with the Ottawa BlackJacks of the CEBL.

Club Africain (2022–present) 
Lemon signed with Club Africain in Tunisia in 2022.

Career statistics

NBA

Regular season

|-
| style="text-align:left;"| 
| style="text-align:left;"| New Orleans
| 5 || 0 || 7.0 || .438 || 1.000 || .667 || .4 || 1.0 || .0 || .2 || 3.4
|-
| style="text-align:left;"| 
| style="text-align:left;"| Chicago
| 6 || 3 || 27.8 || .437 || .400 || .727 || 4.5 || 5.0 || 1.8 || .2 || 14.3
|- class="sortbottom"
| style="text-align:center;" colspan="2"| Career
| 11 || 3 || 18.4 || .437 || .500 || .714 || 2.6 || 3.2 || 1.0 || .2 || 9.4

College

|-
| style="text-align:left;"| 2010–11
| style="text-align:left;"| Bradley
| 31 || 5 || 20.0 || .419 || .324 || .660 || 2.4 || .9 || .9 || .4 || 6.4
|-
| style="text-align:left;"| 2011–12
| style="text-align:left;"| Bradley
| 32 || 25 || 30.7 || .471 || .345 || .667 || 3.1 || 2.5 || 1.3 || .5 || 12.6
|-
| style="text-align:left;"| 2012–13
| style="text-align:left;"| Bradley
| 35 || 34 || 34.3 || .451 || .330 || .761 || 4.2 || 3.8 || 2.1 || .4 || 15.6
|-
| style="text-align:left;"| 2013–14
| style="text-align:left;"| Bradley
| 32 || 31 || 35.5 || .424 || .290 || .746 || 3.1 || 3.9 || 2.4 || .1 || 18.0
|- class="sortbottom"
| style="text-align:center;" colspan="2"| Career
| 130 || 95 || 30.3 || .442 || .321 || .719 || 3.2 || 2.8 || 1.7 || .3 || 13.2

Personal life
He is the son of Walter Sr. and Katrina Lemon and is one of three siblings. Earning a spot on the Bradley Athletic Director's Honor Roll three times, Lemon earned his bachelor's degree in psychology. Growing up in Chicago, he always wanted to be like Derrick Rose and it shows in his game with flashy passes and hard cut to the hoop.

References

External links
 Bradley Braves bio
 RealGM profile

1992 births
Living people
American expatriate basketball people in Canada
American expatriate basketball people in Germany
American expatriate basketball people in Greece
American expatriate basketball people in Hungary
American expatriate basketball people in Israel
American expatriate basketball people in Turkey
American men's basketball players
Basketball players from Chicago
BC Körmend players
Bradley Braves men's basketball players
Chicago Bulls players
Club Africain basketball players
Crailsheim Merlins players
Fort Wayne Mad Ants players
Maine Red Claws players
New Orleans Pelicans players
Ottawa Blackjacks players
Point guards
Rethymno B.C. players
Undrafted National Basketball Association players
Windy City Bulls players